Seven is a 2019 Nigerian crime action thriller film directed by Tosin Igho and produced by tosin igho & Bryan Dike. The film stars Efa Iwara, Richard Mofe Damijo, Bimbo Manuel, Daddy Showkey, Patrick Diabuah, Uche Nwaefunam, Sadiq Daba. It was released on 29 November 2019 and premiered on Netflix in 2019.

Plot 
The theme of the film revolves around Kolade after his affluent father passes, he must survive seven days in the Nigerian neighbourhood of Ajegunle, where obstacles keep him from his inheritance.
The movie opens with a doctor checking the brain X-rays of a patient and upon observation, he tells his fellow resident the tumour has spread drastically and there is no cure or treatment for the patient that will work as the cancer is too far gone.

Cast 

 Kehinde Ajayi as Male Doctor
 Ogunsanwo Anita as Lawyer's Secretary
 Chiemela Azurunwa as Young Ejiro
 Sadiq Daba as Issah
 Nicholas Diabuah as Prince
 Patrick Diabuah as Bassey
 Bryan Dike as Emeka
 Femi Durojaiye as Mr. Bryan
 Jeremiah Edisemi as Customer in Mamaput
 Edgar Eriakha as Tega
 Aaron Igho as Haruna
 Chris Iheuwa as Commissioner Hassan
 Efa Iwara as Kolade
 Bimbo Manuel as Mr. Tayo
 Salami Bela Maureen as Hadiza's Friend
 Richard Mofe-Damijo as Ejiro
 Uche Nwaefuna as Efe
 Nene Nwanyo as Rose
 Nkeiru Nwaobiala as Kolade's Mother
 Chioma Nwosu as Mamaput Owner
 Tomi Odunsi as Wando
 Evaezi Ogoro as Dr. Aisha
 Gregory Ojefua as Sammir
 Blessing Omori as Mamaput Assistant
 Temitope Onayemi as Hadiza
 Daddy Showkey as Croaker
 Koffi Tha Guru as Tosin
 Uzikwendu as Undu
 Tony White as Felix

References

External links 

 
 

English-language Nigerian films
Nigerian drama films
2019 films
2019 drama films
2010s English-language films
Nigerian crime thriller films
Nigerian action thriller films